Katwa is a town in Bardhaman district of Indian state of West Bengal.

Katwa may also refer to:

 Katwa subdivision, West Bengal, India
 Katwa I (community development block)
 Katwa II (community development block)
 Katwa (Lok Sabha constituency)
 Katwa (Vidhan Sabha constituency)
 Katwa College, West Bengal, India
 Katwa Junction railway station
 Katwa, North Kivu, Democratic Republic of Congo

See also
 Kotwa (disambiguation)